The 2015 Calderdale Metropolitan Borough Council election took place on 7 May 2015 to elect members of Calderdale in England. This was on the same day as other local elections and a general election. One councillor was elected in each ward for a four-year term so the councillors elected in 2015 last stood for election in 2011. Each ward is represented by three councillors, the election of which is staggered, so only one third of the councillors were elected in this election. Before the election there was no overall control with a minority Labour administration which was over-ruled at a Budget vote by a coalition of Conservatives & Liberal Democrats leading to a Conservative minority administration. After the election there was still no overall control & a Labour minority administration was formed again.

Council results 

The percentage change for the National Front vote is compared to the combined showing for the BNP & BPP parties in 2011.

Council composition
Prior to the election the composition of the council was:

After the election the composition of the council was:

Ward results
The electoral division results listed below are based on the changes from the last time this third was up for election, in the 2011 elections, not taking into account any mid-term by-elections or party defections.

Brighouse ward

The incumbent was Scott Benton for the Conservative Party.

Calder ward

The incumbent was Dave Young for the Labour Party.

Elland ward

The incumbent was John Ford for the Conservative Party.

Greetland & Stainland ward

The incumbent Peter Wardhaugh for the Liberal Democrats stood down at this election.

Hipperholme & Lightcliffe ward

The incumbent was David Kirton for the Conservative Party.

Illingworth & Mixenden ward

The incumbent was Barry Collins for the Labour Party.

Luddendenfoot ward

The incumbent was Richard Marshall for the Conservative Party who stood down at this election.

Northowram & Shelf ward

The incumbent was Roger Taylor for the Conservative Party.

Ovenden ward

The incumbent was Bryan Smith for the Labour Party.

Park ward

The incumbent was Faisal Shoukat for the Labour Party.

The Swing is from the Liberal Democrat party to the Labour Party.

Rastrick ward

The incumbent was Chris Pillai for the Conservative Party.

Ryburn ward

The incumbent was Robert Thornber for the Conservative Party.

Skircoat ward

The incumbent was Marcus Thompson for the Conservative Party.
The Swing is from Liberal Democrat to Conservative.

Sowerby Bridge ward

The incumbent was Dave Draycott for the Labour Party.

Todmorden ward

The incumbent was Jayne Booth for the Labour Party.

The percentage change for the National Front is expressed compared to the showing of the BPP party in 2011.

Town ward

The incumbent was Timothy Smith for the Labour Party.

Warley ward

The incumbent was James Baker for the Liberal Democrats.

References

2015 English local elections
May 2015 events in the United Kingdom
2015
2010s in West Yorkshire